Suillus subalutaceus is an edible species of mushroom in the genus Suillus. It is found in North America and in Taiwan.

See also
List of North American boletes

References

External links

subalutaceus
Fungi of Asia
Fungi of North America
Edible fungi
Fungi described in 1971
Taxa named by Alexander H. Smith